Symmoca rifellus is a moth in the family Autostichidae. It was described by Zerny in 1932. It is found in Morocco.

The wingspan is about 15 mm.

References

Moths described in 1932
Symmoca